François Certain (born December 16, 1977 in Mont-Saint-Aignan) is an footballer.

Career
He plays as a midfielder, and in the 1997-98 season played two Ligue 2 matches for Niort.

References

1977 births
Living people
French footballers
Association football midfielders
Chamois Niortais F.C. players
Ligue 2 players
People from Mont-Saint-Aignan
ESA Brive players
Sportspeople from Seine-Maritime
Footballers from Normandy